Arno Wolle (24 February 1903 in Copenhagen, Denmark – 2 July 1988 in Wicklow County, Ireland) was a Danish naturopath and mathematician.

Biography 
Wolle worked as a mathematician at the Danish Department of Defense and later at the Ministry of Finance. He is primarily known for the herbal blends that he developed. His works about herbal blends involved observation and examination of medicinal plants and their usages. In the course of his work, he created more than 100 herbal mixtures. These mixtures were subsequently distributed in Denmark via reform houses and drugstores. Wolle became a known alternative practitioner after Danish newspaper BT claimed in a report about his herbal medicines having the ability to cure many diseases.  Consequently, it was reported that his telephone number, 114 in Kattinge went broken as many started to try to reach him. It was also reported that, during the peak of his practice, he used to visit 30 to 40 patients per day. Journalist Tabita Wulff in A Swedish newspaper addressed him as the 'Herb King of The North'. Furthermore, a song about him and his achievements was played in the Danish hit parade.

Death and legacy 
Wolle died on 2 July 1988 in Newtown Mount Kennedy in Wicklow County, Ireland. Wolle’s therapy was very popular among his patients during his lifetime but has not been scientifically recognized so far. In 1994, Finn Jensen Smed at Rask Molle Animal Hospital, Jutland, carried out a trial on the animal diseases, where a bunch of dogs who couldn't be treated with traditional medicines, were treated with the herbal mixtures of Wolle and the results were examined to judge the effectiveness.

Bibliography 
 Arno Wolle; Jørgen Munkebo, Bogen om Arno Wolle, ISBN 9788785214027
 Wulff, Tabita. Naturens apotek - ifølge Arno Wolle. Denmark: Alternatur, (n.d.).
 Jørgen Munkebo: Bogen om Arno Wolle. Naturforlaget, 1975. ISBN 9788785214027
 Jørgen Juhldahl: Arno Wolle’s Nature Medicine. Praxis Verlag, 1981, ISBN 8798085832
 Healing by Hand: Manual Medicine and Bonesetting in Global Perspective. United States: AltaMira Press, 2004.

References 

1903 births
1988 deaths
Naturopaths